Edward "Eddie" Blay (9 November 1937 – 15 October 2006) was a Ghanaian boxer. He competed at the 1960 and 1964 Olympics and won a bronze medal in the light welterweight (63.5 kg) category in 1964. Blay was a two-time Commonwealth Games champion, in 1962 and 1966,and amateur boxer from the late 50s to 1968, and later briefly fought as a professional boxer. He lived in Italy for some time, and after returning to Ghana established the Sole Mio restaurant at Osu, Accra.

1960 Summer Olympic Games results

Below is the record of Eddie Blay, a Ghanaian lightweight boxer who competed at the 1960 Summer Olympic Games in Rome, Italy:

 Round of 32: defeated Gualberto Gutierrez (Uruguay) by decision, 4-1
 Round of 16: lost to Richard McTaggart (Great Britain) by decision, 0-5

References

External links

 "Eddie Blay", Box Rec.
 "A Tribute To Eddie Blay", GhanaWeb, 12 November 2006.

1937 births
2006 deaths
Olympic boxers of Ghana
Boxers at the 1960 Summer Olympics
Boxers at the 1964 Summer Olympics
Olympic bronze medalists for Ghana
Medalists at the 1964 Summer Olympics
Commonwealth Games gold medallists for Ghana
Boxers from Accra
Boxers at the 1962 British Empire and Commonwealth Games
Boxers at the 1966 British Empire and Commonwealth Games
Olympic medalists in boxing
Restaurateurs
Ghanaian male boxers
Commonwealth Games medallists in boxing
Lightweight boxers
Medallists at the 1962 British Empire and Commonwealth Games
Medallists at the 1966 British Empire and Commonwealth Games